Last Weekend or The Last Weekend may refer to:
Last Weekend (2005 film), a Russian thriller film
 Last Weekend (2014 film), American comedy-drama film
 The Last Weekend, 2010 novel by Blake Morrison
 The Last Weekend (TV series), 2010 UK miniseries based on the novel
 Pure Mule: The Last Weekend, Irish TV drama